Garumna is a genus of Asian planthoppers in the family Tropiduchidae and tribe Tambiniini, erected by Leopold Melichar in 1914.

Species
The following have been recorded from Thailand and western Malesia:
 Garumna lepida Melichar, 1914 - type species
 Garumna melichari Baker, 1927
 Garumna pseudolepida (Muir, 1931)

References

External links

Auchenorrhyncha genera
Tropiduchidae
Hemiptera of Asia